Club Polideportivo Olivenza was a football team based in Olivenza in the autonomous community of Extremadura. Founded in 1952, its final season was in the 2010–11 Tercera División.

It disbanded due to limited financial resources.

Season to season

19 seasons in Tercera División

References

External links
AREFE profile 
fexfutbol.com profile

Association football clubs established in 1952
Association football clubs disestablished in 2011
Defunct football clubs in Extremadura
1952 establishments in Spain
2011 disestablishments in Spain
Province of Badajoz